The Cornell–Harvard hockey rivalry is a men's ice hockey sports rivalry between the Big Red of Cornell University and Crimson of Harvard University dating back to 1910.

Cornell and Harvard play each other twice each regular season with games at Cornell's Lynah Rink in Ithaca, New York and Harvard's Bright Hockey Center in Allston, Massachusetts. The success of both programs ensures that postseason meetings are common. The rivals meet more than twice each season frequently. Cornell and Harvard have met 158 times on the ice including their first contest on January 8, 1910. Cornell leads the series 79–67–12 as of November 5, 2021.

History

Early years
The rivalry between Cornell and Harvard pits the oldest member of the Ivy League that was founded 140 years before the signing of the Declaration of Independence against the youngest member of the Ivy League that in April 2015 celebrated its 150th year of operation. One could muse that the rivalry began with the founding of Cornell University. Ezra Cornell, when confronted with an impasse to the creation of his university in the New York State Senate, quipped famously that "I am not sure but that it would be a good thing for me to give the half a million to old Harvard College in Massachusetts, to educate the descendants of the men who hanged my ancestors." Such animosity would have to wait nearly five decades before it found expression on ice.

Students of academic institutions along the East Coast began forming collegiate hockey clubs around the turn of the 20th century. Yale was among the first institutions to create such a program. It was not long until Cornell and Harvard joined the ranks of their peer institutions in the East on the ice. However, the two programs could not have begun their debuts to a sport, that they both went on to dominate, in more disparate manners. Harvard took the ice in 1898 and lost to future Ivy-League foe Brown 6–0.  Cornell earned a 3–0–0 record in 1901, winning contests against Penn, Princeton, and Swarthmore.

Developing hockey powers of the East
The paths of the program diverged after that point. Harvard became the dominant program in Eastern play, especially among the members who would come to constitute the Ivy League. Cornell and Harvard had played fourteen times in the span between January 1910 and February 1962. Harvard held a 13–1–0 record over Cornell until February 3, 1962.

Lynah Rink at Cornell had been completed in 1957. Its potential lay dormant, with Cornell hockey drawing 2,000–3,000 fans per game in the approximately 3,800-seat arena. That all changed when the end of the 1961–62 season of men's ice hockey approached.

Cornell entered February 1962 with a 7–4–0 record. Cornell believed it was on the verge of earning its first winning season since Cornell hockey moved indoors from Beebe Lake. Cornell fans began to place emphasis upon a key clash on February 3, 1962, the opponent: Harvard. Harvard had dominated the Ivy League since its inception in 1954, winning all but one of the Ivy-League championships in men's ice hockey until that point. Cornell was in contention to win the title and reclaim its former glory with a win over the Crimson.

The February 1962 game was charged with passion among the Cornell fans. Harvard and its fans approached the game with a level of apathy. The excitement at Cornell gave rise to "The Line" before the Cornell-Harvard game. The February 1962 game was an inflection point for Cornell hockey and The Line became a rite of passage for all those who wish to join the ranks of the Lynah Faithful, the loyal and fanatical fans of Cornell hockey. Lynah was beyond capacity with 4,500 spectators watching as Cornell upset Harvard 2–1.

"The Canadians" against the Crimson
Cornell seized the momentum of the upswing in its fortune and its brightest days were ahead of it. Cornell hired college hockey coach Ned Harkness from RPI in 1963. An RPI fan asked Harkness on the eve of his departure from Troy, New York, why Harkness was leaving RPI for Cornell. Harkness responded, "because, Ithaca is exactly 90 miles closer to the Canadian border than Troy."

Reliance upon Canadian talent to forge winning traditions at the institutions where Harkness coached created enmity between Cornell and other East Coast programs, especially Harvard. This added yet another level to the increasingly heated Cornell-Harvard clashes.

Harvard was a reservoir of hockey talent from the United States. The Crimson was proud of its reliance upon American talent. The program defined itself upon that principle. This proud, Harvardian tradition helped the United States claim its first gold medal in men's ice hockey at the 1960 Winter Olympics. This accomplishment was in no small part because of the contributions of four Harvardians including future Harvard head coach, Bill Cleary.

The recruiting practices of Harkness and traditions of Harvard placed the two programs on a collision course. This tension was exacerbated by Cornell's record of 15–2–0 against Harvard during his tenure from 1963–70. Harvard players, Harvard fans, and The Harvard Crimson appropriated the term "the Canadians" as a pejorative for the Big Red.

The Lynah Faithful embraced the attempted slight from the Crimson. Cornell celebrated the contributions of talented Canadians to their hockey program. As a manifestation of this pride in the Big Red's Canadian players, the Lynah Faithful began serenading their Canadian players with "O Canada" when Cornell played in a venue that played only "The Star-Spangled Banner". Even though Cornell has become more reliant upon American talent and Harvard has embraced recruitment of Canadian talent in recent years, this tradition of the Lynah Faithful continues today.

Harvard grew frustrated with its lack of success against Cornell in this era. Harvard, like many athletic directors in the Ivy League, began to emphasize that the Ivy League refuses to admit student-athletes who could not earn admission into each respective institution upon their own scholastic merits alone, and because Cornell's academic requirements were lower than those of Harvard, the Big Red's pool of eligible talent was much larger than that of Harvard. This added an academic element to the Cornell-Harvard rivalry that lingers today.

The Rivalry Grows Fowl and Fishy
Harvard continued to disparage Cornell for its lower academic standards. The argument continued much like it did during the Harkness era. Harvard mocked Cornell as being an academic institution of lower caliber than Harvard. Fans and coaches from Harvard alike pointed to New York State's College of Agriculture and Life Sciences at Cornell University as proof that Cornell and Harvard were not peer institutions and that the standards of the latter were far superior to those of the former. It did not take long for this criticism to find display on ice.

A Harvard fan threw a dead chicken at Cornell goalie Dave Elenbaas on January 6, 1973 during a Cornell-Harvard game at Harvard. The chicken was an unsubtle and insulting allusion to the College of Agriculture and Life Sciences at Cornell. The Lynah Faithful were not to be outdone. They had just over a month to plan their retaliation.

One member of the Lynah Faithful decided to throw dead fish on the ice when the Crimson braved Lynah Rink on February 17, 1973. Many spectators assumed the fish to be a reference to Boston's seafood industry. Harvard fans retaliated during the same game by tying a live chicken to Cornell's goalpost.

William Ruskin (Cornell '74) disagreed with this interpretation of events. He stated in 2006 that after hearing about Harvard's original 1973 chicken prank, he and his friends decided to get revenge, and started planning.  "Contrary to what was in The New York Times this week, there was no intention at the time to have any symbolism of the New England fishing industry. We merely wanted to put something disgusting in their net...getting a big smelly fish seemed like the best thing we could do." The tradition continued in February 1977 at Lynah when members of the Lynah Faithful tied a chicken to the Harvard goalpost between the second and third periods.  The chicken was placed there by the late Bill "Wiffy" Silvia, a member of the class of 1978, Phi Sigma Kappa at Cornell, and a proud Big Red fan.  Silvia said that placing the chicken was one of the proudest moments of his Cornell undergraduate years.  Silvia had assistance in getting the chicken into Lynah Rink from the Big Red Bear at the time, the late Ron Winarick.

The tradition has taken a more standardized form since the 1970s. The Lynah Faithful deluge the Crimson with fish when the Harvard team takes the ice at Lynah Rink. Harvard fans throw dead chickens at Cornell when the fans rediscover periodically the Harvard tradition of doing so. Harvard fans rediscovered this tradition before and acted accordingly during the Cornell-Harvard game at Bright on November 11, 2011.

The rivalry became exceedingly charged and chants of "Harvard sucks" became common at Lynah Rink and during postseason clashes between the foes. Future Cornell hockey head coach Mike Schafer (Cornell '86) skated to center ice during roster announcements before the Cornell-Harvard contest at Lynah on December 10, 1983. He carried with him a hockey stick with "Harvard Sucks" written on it. He proceeded to break it over his head to the raucous applause and acclaim of the Lynah Faithful.  The Cornell-Harvard rivalry had solidified its status as a true sporting spectacle.

Leave It On The Ice
The air of begrudging respect in the Cornell-Harvard rivalry gave way to sheer animosity in an incident in 1990. Harvard entered the 1989–90 season as the defending NCAA national champion. Harvard head coach Bill Cleary of 1960 Team USA Olympic fame had announced prior to the season that it would be the last season of his career as a college hockey coach at Harvard.

The season did not go as hoped for Harvard. The Crimson wanted to send off their head coach on a high note. Harvard earned only a 13–14–1 record and placed sixth in seeding for the ECAC Tournament.

Harvard breathed a sigh of relief when it realized that it would play Cornell in the ECAC Tournament. Harvard had an active 11-game winning streak against the Big Red heading into the competition. The elation and relief was well-published before the meeting with Cornell in that postseason. Cornell controlled play during the three-game series and swept Harvard with victories of 6–2 and 4–2.

Traditionally, college hockey teams shake hands at the end of a series with an opponent. The end of this game was the last game of Cleary's coaching career. It was an unceremonious and disappointing end that the Big Red forced him to endure. Cleary instructed his team to leave the ice without shaking the hands of the Cornell team.

Harvard celebrated the contributions of Cleary to the Harvard hockey program and USA Hockey with the retirement of the number 4 that he wore while he was a player at Harvard. The rafters of Bright are adorned with a retired number 4 banner to commemorate his contributions to the program. The ECAC named the trophy awarded to the winner of the regular-season title in Cleary's honor in 2002. The Cleary Cup is awarded to the team each season that earns the best regular-season, intraconference record in the ECAC.

While Harvard lauds the legacy of Cleary to Harvard and USA Hockey, Cornell remembers his last
official act as coach with his instruction that his players were to leave the ice without congratulating
Cornell. Cornell demonstrates its remembrance of that act each time that Cornell wins the Cleary Cup.
Cornell leaves the Cup on the ice and the players refuse to touch it. Cornell continued this tradition the
last time that it won the regular-season title in 2005.

Today
Current Cornell head coach Mike Schafer emphasized how important the rivalry was to the hockey cultures of both programs when he listed defeating the Crimson as one of his three goals for his first season in 1995–96. Harvard was unbeaten in the last 20 regular-season games against the Big Red at that time. Schafer's record against Harvard as a coach is 38–20–6 as of January 18, 2019. Cornell went on to defeat Harvard in three games that season with a 5–3 win at Lynah, 5–4 win at Bright, and a 2–1 win at Lake Placid in the ECAC Championship Final. This change of fate reinvigorated the rivalry to the level of passion it enjoys in the present era.

The rivalry has grown into a wholly reciprocated event between the student bodies of Cornell and Harvard. Cornell is abuzz the week before any contest against Harvard. Harvard has declared that Cornell has surpassed Yale as its primary rival. An article from The Harvard Crimson in 2010 stated emphatically that, "[f]or though Harvard-Yale weekend is historic in its own right, the Bulldogs can no longer be considered the Crimson's most hated foe." The rivalry has been characterized as being "as big and as boisterous as a Michigan-Ohio State football contest."

The taunts between the fan bases have grown and adapted in the modern era of the rivalry. The unison chant of "Harvard sucks" is ubiquitous at games between the rivals. However, the repertoire of both fanbases has expanded in recent years. The Lynah Faithful and Harvard fans are heard often exchanging the taunt of "safety school". Harvard fans rationalize this because the acceptance rate at Harvard College is usually less than half the university-wide acceptance rate at Cornell. The Lynah Faithful reason that they can call Harvard a "safety school" because Harvard may be the Ivy-League institution into which it is hardest to gain admission, but it is among the easiest to "get out of" with its lax grading policies. These exchanges highlight a common feature of taunts during the Cornell-Harvard rivalry in recent years that involve references to grade inflation and admissions standards. Cornell is among the most grade deflationary institutions in the United States. Grading practices at Harvard have been cited as examples of grade inflation. The Lynah Faithful have capitalized upon these findings and incorporated them in their taunts of the Crimson with cheers of "grade inflation" and "Give me an A, give me another A, give me another A, give me another A, welcome to Harvard."

The Cornell-Harvard rivalry has become a contest between two academic institutions and hockey programs that have grown to respect, albeit begrudgingly, the history and accomplishments of each other. The combination of passion, taunting, and respect has led many sports commentators to consider the Cornell-Harvard rivalry as one of the best in sports.

Lynah East

The relatively large numbers of the Lynah Faithful who travel to away games have caused contests at Bright to be played in front of predominantly pro-Cornell crowds sometimes.  The willingness of the Lynah Faithful to travel to away games at Bright in particular has led many in the Cornell community to think of Cornell-at-Harvard games as de facto home games for Cornell, and earned Bright, and by extension the Cornell-Harvard game played there, the nickname of Lynah East.

Relevance of the Rivalry

Cornell and Harvard are the most successful current members of ECAC Hockey. Cornell leads the conference with the greatest number of ECAC Championships with 12 while Harvard is second with 11 championships. Harvard and Cornell are tied for the most regular-season conference titles with 11 each. Cornell and Harvard have met seven times in the ECAC Championship Final. This makes it the most common pairing of opponents in the championship game. Cornell has won four of those contests. Harvard won the most recent in 2017. The two programs account for 40% of all ECAC Championships won and 36% of all regular-season titles awarded in a twelve-team conference. Additionally, since the formal creation of the Ivy League in 1956, Cornell has won the greatest number of Ivy-League titles in men's ice hockey with 25 while Harvard has 24. 

Post season game results:

Cornell-Harvard Rivalry in Film

Love Story

The Cornell-Harvard game is prominent in the first half of both the novel and film adaptations of Love Story. The protagonist of both is Oliver Barrett. Barrett is a student at Harvard College and member of the Crimson hockey team. Harvard loses the game against Cornell in the plot of both works. The Cornell Big Red Pep Band plays the theme from Love Story when Harvard takes the ice before the first two periods of every Cornell-Harvard clash in commemoration of Cornell's victory in this fictional game.

The film was shot on site at Harvard and depicts Cornell's campus but the Ithaca scenes were shot at Hamilton College in Clinton, NY.

Erich Segal, the author and screenwriter of Love Story, was a Harvard alumnus. The centrality that Segal gave the Cornell-Harvard game in his work demonstrated that he believed the rivalry to be of great significance to both universities.

Game results
Full game results for the rivalry, with rankings beginning in the 1998–99 season.

Series facts

See also
 Lynah Rink (Cornell)
 Bright Hockey Center (Harvard)
 Harvard–Yale Regatta (rowing)
 The Game (Harvard vs. Yale, football)

Notes

References

External links
 Ivy League Men's Ice Hockey Champions by Year

College ice hockey rivalries in the United States
Cornell Big Red ice hockey
Harvard Crimson ice hockey
1910 establishments in New York (state)